Tyler Hotson (born 30 May 1985, in Vancouver, British Columbia) is a Canadian rugby union player who plays at lock.

Hotson currently plays his rugby with Doncaster Knights in the Aviva Championship. He previously played for the Canadian club UBC Old Boys Ravens and Australian club Northern Suburb.

He has been part of the Canadian national team since his debut at the 2008 Churchill Cup in a 26-10 victory over the United States. Hotson represented Canada at the 2011 Rugby World Cup.

References

1985 births
Canadian rugby union players
Canadian expatriate sportspeople in England
Living people
Plymouth Albion R.F.C. players
Sportspeople from Vancouver
University of British Columbia alumni
Canada international rugby union players
Rugby union locks